Kim Kyu-sik, also spelled Kimm Kiusic (Korean:김규식, Hanja:金奎植, January 29, 1881 – December 10, 1950), was a Korean politician and academic during the Korean independence movement and a leader of the Provisional Government of the Republic of Korea. Kim served in various roles in the provisional government, including as foreign minister, ambassador, education minister and finally as the vice president from 1940 until the provisional government's dissolution on March 3, 1947. Kim's nicknames included Usa(우사), Kummun(금문), Kimsong(김성), and Chukchok(죽적).

Life and career

Early life

Kim was born in Dongnae, now part of modern-day Busan. Orphaned at an early age, Kim studied with American missionary H.G. Underwood starting from the age of 6, taking the Christian name "Johann". He later traveled to the United States, receiving a bachelor's degree from Roanoke College in 1903 and a master's degree in English literature from Princeton University the following year.

In 1905 Kim returned to Korea, teaching widely. Following the 1910 Japanese annexation of Korea Kim fled to China in 1913.

Provisional Government of the Republic of Korea

In 1919 Kim traveled to Paris for the Paris Peace Conference to lobby for Korean independence from Japan.  He was sent by Lyuh Woon-Hyung and Chang Duk-soo, who had organized Sinhan Cheongnyeondang in Shanghai in the summer of 1919.  His efforts in Paris proved to be futile.

The Korean National Revolutionary Party was formed in Shanghai in 1935 through a grouping of nationalist Korean parties.
Organizers were Kim Kyu-sik, Kim Won-bong and Cho Soang.

Kim was a leading member of the Provisional Government of the Republic of Korea based in Shanghai, becoming the Vice-President. He was fluent in English and taught English to the Provisional Government's members.

After Korean Liberation
After the post World War II liberation of Korea in 1945, he returned to his homeland to join in the formation of a newly independent state, which was then under the rule of the United States Army Military Government in Korea in the south and the Soviet Civil Authority in the north.  Kim was favored by the American occupation leader John R. Hodge, who saw him and Lyuh Woon-Hyung as moderate leaders on the right and left, respectively.  In September 1947, the United States and Lee Seung Man (이승만; 李承晩 – also known as Syngman Rhee) et al. pushed to move the Korean question to the newly created United Nations, which voted to allow for elections in the south despite the objections of southern nationalists such as Kim and Kim Gu as well as from the north's Interim People's Committee, who were opposed because of the non-participation of the North.

Death 
After failed efforts to broker reunification in that year, he retired from politics.  After the outbreak of the Korean War in 1950, he was kidnapped and taken to the North; he reportedly died near Manpo in the far north on December 10.

In May 1988 he was posthumously awarded the Republic of Korea Medal of Order of Merit for National Foundation (건국훈장 대한민국장; 建國勳章 大韓民國章), the most prestigious civil decoration in South Korea.  He was posthumously awarded North Korea's National Reunification Prize in 1998.

Other information
 Educational career
 December 17, 1913 in Shanghai, a professor of Barkdal English School
 1923 professor of English at Fudan University
 1927–1929 In Tianjin, Northern Sea University  Professor of English
 1932–1937 Nanjing political instructor School, professor of political.
 1937–1940 ShChwan College Professor of English Literature, Foreign Languages and Chair, Head of Foreign Language and Literature

 Books
 Poems, 《Yangjayugyong》(양자유경)
 《Small English grammar》
 《Practical English》
 《Elizabeth I Age's Introduction to Theatre》
 《WonYongSa》

 Degrees
 1903 Roanoke College(Bachelor of Arts)
 1904 Master of English Literature(MA) at Princeton University
 1923 Honorary Doctor of Law Roanoke College

 Awards and recognition
 Order of Merit for National Foundation (1988)
 National Reunification Prize (1988)

See also
 Korea under Japanese rule
 PGOTROK
 USAMGIK
 Kim Seong-su
 Pak Hon-yong
 List of Koreans

Notes

Further reading
 

 
Korean male poets
Korean politicians
People of World War I
People of World War II
Korean independence activists
Korean religious leaders
1881 births
1950 deaths
Soh Jaipil
People from Busan
Roanoke College alumni
Princeton University alumni
Korean Presbyterians
Korean diplomats
Assassinated Korean politicians
Assassinated South Korean people
Korean nationalists
Korean revolutionaries
South Korean anti-communists
Korean educators
Kim Won-bong
Recipients of the Order of Merit for National Foundation
Recipients of the National Reunification Prize